This list includes major feature films shot either completely or partially in Pittsburgh, Pennsylvania and/or the Pittsburgh metropolitan area. Some of these are set in the city; others were shot in Pittsburgh but set in another real or fictional location

1890s

1897
 The Prophecy of the Gargoyle

1898
Tancred Commandery, Pittsburg

1899
 Heros of Luzon
Running Through Gallitzin Tunnel

1900s

1902
Panoramic View
Jones & Laughlin Steel Yard

1903
Pittsburgh Fire Department in Full Run
 The Prophecy of the Gargoyle II: Gregor's Return

1904
Assembling a Generator
Assembling and Testing Turbines
Casting a Guide Box
Coil Winding Machines
Coil Winding Section E
Girls Winding Armatures
Panorama Exterior Westinghouse Works
Panorama of Machine Co. Aisle
Panorama View Street Car Motor Room
Panorama View Aisle B
Steam Hammer
Steam Whistle
Taking Time Checks
Taping Coils
Tapping a Furnace
Testing a Rotary
Testing Large Turbines
Welding the Big Ring
Westinghouse Employees Boarding Train
Westinghouse Air Brake Co. Westinghouse Co. Works (Casting Scene)
Westinghouse Air Brake Co. Westinghouse Co. Works (Moulding Scene)
Westinghouse Air Brake Co. Westinghouse Works

1905
The Juvenile

1910s
1912
Olympic Games, Pittsburgh YMCA

1914
Filial Love
The Perils of Pauline
Pearl White

1915
Via Wireless

1918
Just a Woman

1919
Spring Fever
Harold Lloyd

1920s
1920
The North Wind's Malice

1922
In the Name of the Law
Honus Wagner, Jeanne Carpenter

1924
Fording the Lincoln Highway
William A. Magee

1926
Buy an Electric Refrigerator

1930s
1931
The Pip from Pittsburgh

1936
Can You Imagine

1939
The City
Allegheny Uprising
John Wayne, Claire Trevor

1940s
1940
Valley Town
1941
The Pittsburgh Kid

1942
Pittsburgh
John Wayne, Marlene Dietrich
Columbia World Of Sports: College Champions

1945
The Valley of Decision
Lionel Barrymore, Jessica Tandy
1947
The Unconquered
Helen Keller, Gertrude Stein

1948
Melody Time
Dennis Day

1950s
1951
Angels in the Outfield
Bing Crosby, Joe DiMaggio, Ty Cobb
I Was a Communist for the FBI
Frank Lovejoy, Dorothy Hart

1952
Pat and Mike
Spencer Tracy, Katharine Hepburn
The Winning Team
Ronald Reagan, Doris Day

1955
Lonesome Trail

1958
Some Came Running
Frank Sinatra, Shirley MacLaine, Dean Martin

1960s
1960
The Rat Race
Tony Curtis, Debbie Reynolds, Don Rickles

1963
A Visit to Santa

1965
Sylvia
Peter Lawford, Carroll Baker

1968
Night of the Living Dead
Duane Jones, Judith O'Dea

1970s
1970
Imago
Looking for Me
Inside/Outside Station 9

1971
There's Always Vanilla
Vagrant Woman
Going Home
Robert Mitchum, Brenda Vaccaro
The Act of Seeing with One's Own Eyes
Eyes
Deus Ex
Three Domestics

1972
Jack's Wife
Investigation of a Hit and Run
901/904

1973
The Crazies
Lynn Lowry, Richard Liberty
The Song Remains the Same
Robert Plant, Jimmy Page
After the Game
A Forty Dollar Misunderstanding
The Informant
A Legal Discussion of a Hit and Run
Manifold Controversy
Nothing Hurt But My Pride
Two Brothers
$21 or 21 days
Wrong Kid
You Wasn't Loitering
Henry Is Drunk
The 4th, 5th, & Exclusionary Rule

1974
The Devil and Sam Silverstein

1976
Betty's Corner Cafe

1977
Slap Shot
Paul Newman, Lindsay Crouse
Incident at Browns Ferry

1978
Martin
Tom Savini, John Amplas
The Deer Hunter
Christopher Walken, Meryl Streep, Robert De Niro
Death Penalty
Dawn of the Dead
Tom Savini

1979
The Fish That Saved Pittsburgh
Jonathan Winters, Stockard Channing, Flip Wilson, Julius Erving

1980s
1980
Effects
All Washed Up

1981
Knightriders
Ed Harris, Patricia Tallman, Tom Savini
What Price Clean Air?
 Robert Richter

1982
Creepshow #1 Nov. 12–18 Top 10 Nov. 12 – Dec. 16
Ed Harris, Hal Holbrook, Ted Danson, Leslie Nielsen
Midnight
John Amplas
Second Challenge
King's Bane
Poland: Two weeks in Winter

1983
Flashdance #1 Apr. 15 – May 12 Top 5 May 15 – Jun. 9 Top 10 -Jul. 28 & Aug. 26 – Oct. 13 Top 15 until Oct. 20 
Jennifer Beals, Michael Nouri
All the Right Moves Top 5 Oct. 21 – Nov. 15 & Dec. 2–Dec. 8 Top 10 until Dec. 15
Tom Cruise, Lea Thompson, Craig T. Nelson
Hambone & Hillie

1984
Mrs. Soffel Top 10 Feb. 8–10, 1985 Top 20 Dec. 28, 1984 – Jan. 10, 1985
Mel Gibson, Diane Keaton
Reckless Top 5 Feb. 3 – Feb. 16
Aidan Quinn, Daryl Hannah, Dan Hedaya
The Muppets Take Manhattan Top 5 Jul. 13–19 Top 10  Jul 20 – Aug. 2 Top 15 until Aug. 16
Maria's Lovers
John Goodman, Nastassja Kinski
The Boy Who Loved Trolls
William H. Macy, Sam Waterston, Susan Anton

1985
Day of the Dead
Rappin' #5 May 10 – May 16 #14 May 17–23
Mario Van Peebles, Rutanya Alda
Moon over Pittsburgh
Silent Witness

1986
Gung Ho #1 Mar. 14–20 Top 5 Mar. 21 – Apr. 24 Top 10 until May 29
Michael Keaton, John Turturro, George Wendt, Mimi Rogers
The Majorettes
The Suicide Squeeze
Flight of the Spruce Goose

1987
RoboCop Top 5 Jul. 17 – Aug. 6 Top 10 Aug. 7–27 Top 15 Until Oct. 1
Peter Weller, Nancy Allen, Miguel Ferrer, Kurtwood Smith
Lady Beware
Michael Woods, Diane Lane
Drive-In Madness!
Alone In The Neon Jungle
Susan Pleshette, Danny Aiello
1988
The Prince of Pennsylvania
Keanu Reeves, Amy Madigan, Fred Ward, Bonnie Bedelia
Heartstopper
Monkey Shines
Stanley Tucci, Janine Turner, Stephen Root, Kate McNeil
Kenny
Caitlin Clarke, Liane Curtis, Zach Grenier
Dominick and Eugene Top 20: Mar. 18–24
Ray Liotta, Jamie Lee Curtis
Tiger Warsaw
Patrick Swayze, Piper Laurie,
Flesheater
Lightning Over Braddock
Street Law
Christina Cox

1989
No Place Like Home
Jeff Daniels
An Unremarkable Life
Shelley Winters
To the Limit
The Awakening

1990s
1990
Pretty Woman #1Mar. 23–29; Apr. 27 – May 17 #2 Mar. 30 – Apr. 26 #3 May 18 – May 31 Top 5-Jun. 14 Top 10-Jul. 12 Top 15 -Oct. 18
Julia Roberts, Richard Gere
Night of the Living Dead #7 Oct. 19–25 #14 Oct. 26 – Nov. 1
Two Evil Eyes #17 Oct. 25–31
Harvey Keitel, Julie Benz
Superstar
Dennis Hopper, Shelley Winters
The 10 Million Dollar Getaway (TV Film)
Iron Maze
Bridget Fonda
Simple Justice
John Spencer, Doris Roberts
 Criminal Justice
 Forest Whitaker, Anthony LaPaglia, Rosie Perez, Jennifer Grey
 https://www.imdb.com/title/tt0099321/?ref_=fn_al_tt_3

1991

The Silence of the Lambs #1 Feb. 15 – Mar. 21 #2 Mar. 22 – Apr. 11 Top 6 Apr. 12 – May 16 Top 15 until Jun. 20
Anthony Hopkins, Scott Glenn, Ted Levine, Jodie Foster
My Girl #2 Nov. 29 – Dec. 5 #3 Dec. 6–12 #4  Nov. 22–28 Top 10 until Jan. 2, 1992
Macaulay Culkin, Dan Aykroyd, Jamie Lee Curtis, Anna Chlumsky
Diary of a Hitman
James Belushi, Forest Whitaker, Sharon Stone
Waterland
Jeremy Irons, Ethan Hawke, Maggie Gyllenhaal
Bloodsucking Pharaohs in Pittsburgh (also known as Picking up the Pieces)
Tom Tully, Maureen McCullough
My Worst Enemy
North of Pittsburgh
Dead and Alive: The Race For Gus Farace

1992
Passed Away #14 Apr. 24–30
Bob Hoskins, Maureen Stapleton, Frances McDormand, Teri Polo
Whispers in the Dark #8 Aug. 7–13 #11 Aug. 14–20
Jamey Sheridan, John Leguizamo, Alan Alda
Bob Roberts Top 15 Sep. 11–17 & Sep. 25 – Oct. 1 Top 20 Sep. 4–Oct. 1
Tim Robbins, Jack Black, Fred Ward, Jeremy Irons, Susan Sarandon, Helen Hunt, John Cusack
Innocent Blood #8 Sep. 25 – Oct. 1 #12 Oct. 2–8
Don Rickles, Chazz Palminteri, Angela Bassett
Hoffa #6 Dec. 25, 1992 – Jan. 7, 1993 #8 Jan. 8–14 #12 until Jan. 21
Jack Nicholson, Danny DeVito
The Cemetery Club
Danny Aiello, Christina Ricci, Diane Ladd, Olympia Dukakis
The Fire Next Time
The Jacksons: An American Dream
No Pets
Triumph of the Heart

1993

Lorenzo's Oil Top 20 Jan. 1–Feb. 4
Nick Nolte, Susan Sarandon, Laura Linney
Groundhog Day #1 Feb. 12–25 #2 Feb. 26 – Mar. 11 Top 18 until Jun. 17
Bill Murray, Andie MacDowell
The Dark Half #6 Apr. 23–29 #8 Apr. 30 – May 6 #11 until May 13
Timothy Hutton, Amy Madigan
Money for Nothing #16 Sep. 10–16
John Cusack, Benicio del Toro, James Gandolfini
Striking Distance #1 Sep. 17–23 #4Sep. 24–30 Top 10 until Oct. 7 Top 15 until Oct. 14
Bruce Willis, Dennis Farina, John Mahoney, Sarah Jessica Parker
Roommates
Peter Falk, D. B. Sweeney, Julianne Moore, Ellen Burstyn
Heartstopper
Coming in Out of the Rain

1994

Boys on the Side #2 Feb. 3–9 #4 Feb. 10–16 Top 10 until Mar. 2
Matthew McConaughey, Drew Barrymore, Mary-Louise Parker, Whoopi Goldberg
Milk Money Top 5 Sep. 2–8 & 16-22 Top 10 until Sep.
Ed Harris, Melanie Griffith, Anne Heche
Timecop #1 Sep. 16–29 #3 Sep. 30 – Oct. 6 #6 until Oct. 13 Top 15 until Oct. 27
Jean-Claude Van Damme, Ron Silver, Gloria Reuben
Only You #3 Oct. 7–13 Top 10 Oct. 14–27 Top 15 until Nov. 
Billy Zane, Robert Downey Jr., Marisa Tomei
Street Corner Justice
Baskin's Run
No Pets

1995

Houseguest #3 Jan. 6–12 #6 Jan. 13–19 Top 11 until Feb. 9
Sinbad, Phil Hartman, Kim Murphy
Sudden Death Top 11 Dec. 22, 1995 – Jan. 7, 1996
Jean-Claude Van Damme, Powers Boothe, Audra Lindley
Captured Alive
Pat Morita
Bloodscent
Undertakings
Bleeding Orange and Brown

1996

Bed of Roses #2 Jan. 26 – Feb. 1 #5 Feb. 2–8 #7 Feb. 9–15
Christian Slater, Mary Stuart Masterson
Diabolique #3 Mar. 22–28 #5 Mar. 29 – Apr. 4 #11 until Apr. 7
Sharon Stone, Isabelle Adjani, Chazz Palminteri, Kathy Bates
Independence Day
Will Smith, Bill Pullman, Jeff Goldblum
Kingpin #4 Jul. 26 – Aug. 1 #6 Aug. 2–8Top 20 until Aug. 18
Bill Murray, Woody Harrelson, Randy Quaid
That Thing You Do! Top 5 Oct. 4–24 Top 10 Oct. 25 – Oct. 31
Tom Hanks, Liv Tyler, Steve Zahn
Santa Claws
Naked Christmas
Struggles in Steel

1997

Fire Down Below #1 Sep. 5–11 #3 Sep. 5–18 #10 Sep. 19–21
Steven Seagal, Kris Kristofferson
The Journey
Sprung (Written, directed and starring native Rusty Cundeiff)

1998

Desperate Measures Top 10 Jan. 30 – Feb. 12 #11 until Feb. 16
Andy García, Michael Keaton, Brian Cox, Marcia Gay Harden
Transatlantic
Star of Jaipur
Linda Gray
Whatever
Liza Weil

1999

Inspector Gadget #2 Jul. 23–29 #5 Jul. 30 – Aug. 5 #7 Aug. 6–26
Matthew Broderick, Rupert Everett, Andy Dick, D. L. Hughley, Dabney Coleman, Joely Fisher, Cheri Oteri
Stigmata #1 Sep. 10–16 #4 Sep. 17–24 Top 10 Sep. 25 – Oct. 7 Top 15 Oct. 8–21
Gabriel Byrne, Jonathan Pryce, Patricia Arquette
Dogma #3 Nov. 12–18 #7 Nov. 19 – Dec. 2 #6 Dec. 3–9 #8 Dec. 10–16 #13 Dec. 17–23
Chris Rock, Matt Damon, Kevin Smith, George Carlin, Salma Hayek
The Nest
Out for Vengeance
Cola for Tea
Achilles Heel

2000s
2000
Eye of the Beholder #1 Jan. 28 – Feb. 3 #5 Feb. 4–10 #9 Feb. 11–17
Ewan McGregor, Jason Priestley, Ashley Judd
Wonder Boys #7 Feb. 25 – Mar. 2 #10 Mar. 3–9 #13 Mar. 10–16 Top 20 Mar. 17–30 
Michael Douglas, Tobey Maguire, Robert Downey Jr., Katie Holmes, Frances McDormand
Screwed #8 May 12–18 #12 May 19–25 #20 May 26 – Jun. 1
Norm Macdonald, Dave Chappelle, Danny DeVito, Sarah Silverman
Civility
William Forsythe, Tom Arnold
View from the Vault
Jerry Garcia
Brother 2
Sergei Bodrov Jr.
Reign of the Dead
Matthew Montgomery, Holly Crenshaw
Out of the Black
Achilles' Love
Ketchup King

2001

Rock Star #4 Sep. 7–13 #9 Sep. 14–20 #8 Sep. 21–27 #17 Sep. 28 – Oct. 4
Mark Wahlberg, Jennifer Aniston
A Wedding for Bella
Scott Baio
High Point
The Resurrection Game
Kristin Pfeifer
Shake 'Em Up

2002

The Mothman Prophecies #6 Jan. 25 – Feb. 7 #10 Feb. 8–14 #18 Feb. 15–21
Richard Gere, Will Patton, Debra Messing
The Murder
Daddy Cool
Memories of a Forgotten War
Project: Valkyrie
Icarus of Pittsburgh

2003
Bringing Down the House #1 Mar. 7–27 Top 5 Mar. 28 – Apr. 17 Top 15 Apr. 18 – May 8 Top 20 May 9–Jun. 12
Steve Martin, Queen Latifah, Eugene Levy
Beautiful Girl
August Underground's Mordum
Vicious
Klownz
Mr. Smith goes to Pittsburgh
Shooting Home
The Battles for Fort Duquesne

2004

The Clearing Top 20 Jul. 2–29
Robert Redford, Willem Dafoe, Helen Mirren
10th & Wolf
Dennis Hopper, Brian Dennehy, Giovanni Ribisi, Val Kilmer, Tommy Lee, Piper Perabo
Grim
Fragile
The War that Made America
Graham Greene
Deadline
Atlanta
When Tyrants Kiss
Lift
The Stranger
Speilburgh
Day of the Scorpion
Dvorak and America

2005

Land of the Dead #6 Jun. 24–30 #10 Jul. 1–7 #15 Jul. 8–14 23 Jul. 15–21
Dennis Hopper, John Leguizamo
Devil and Daniel Johnston
Daniel Johnston
The Bituminous Coal Queens of Pennsylvania
Fabian, Patricia Heaton, Sarah Rush
Me and the Mosque
Dumpster
Squonkumentary
Missing Jane
The Smallest Things
A Thousand Windows
Squonkumentary
Missing Jane
The Smallest Things
A Thousand Windows
On Every Corner

2006

Pittsburgh
Jeff Goldblum, Conan O'Brien, Ed Begley Jr.
Chasing 3000
Ray Liotta, Lauren Holly, Willa Holland
God Grew Tired of Us
 Nicole Kidman
a/k/a Tommy Chong
Tommy Chong
American Scary
Bewilderness
Abattoir
30
Karloff and Me
Project: Adam
Sofia for Now
Grace
Doing Therapy
Prison Girl

2007

The Mysteries of Pittsburgh
Nick Nolte, Sienna Miller, Mena Suvari
Golden Days
Strange Girls
The Haunting Hour Volume One: Don't Think About It
Pain Within
Gravida
The Screening
The Lottery
Dr. Ravie and Mr. Hyde
Myron Cope
Germanity
Gender Redesigner
Happy Walter
Silent Knights
All Saints Eve

2008

Smart People #7 Apr. 11–17 #11 Apr. 18–24 #15 Apr 25 – May 1 #18 May 2–8
Thomas Haden Church, Dennis Quaid, Sarah Jessica Parker, Elliot Page
Zack and Miri Make a Porno #2 Oct. 31 – Nov. 6 #5 Nov. 7–13 #6 Nov. 14–20 #12 Nov. 21–27 #14 Nov. 28 – Dec. 4 #18Dec. 5–11
Seth Rogen, Kevin Smith, Elizabeth Banks
Graduation
The Mausoleum
My Bloody Valentine 3D
Deadtime Stories
Deadtime Stories
Dear Zachary: A Letter to a Son About His Father
The Bridge to Nowhere
Ving Rhames, Bijou Phillips
Homecoming
Jessica Stroup, Mischa Barton
On Sabbath Hill
I Am a Schizophrenic and So Am I
Served Cold
Staunton Hill
Tremble

2009

Adventureland #6 Apr. 3–9 #9 Apr. 10–16 #13 Apr. 17–23 #16 Apr. 24–30 #25 May 1–7
Kristen Stewart, Jesse Eisenberg, Ryan Reynolds, Kristen Wiig
The Road #10 Nov. 27 – Dec. 3 #16 Dec. 4–10 #17 Dec. 11–24 #19 Dec. 25–31 #18 Jan. 1–7 2010
 Viggo Mortensen, Robert Duvall, Charlize Theron
Hollywood & Wine
Chris Kattan, David Spade
Shannon's Rainbow
Louis Gossett Jr., George Lopez, Charles Durning, Steve Guttenberg, Daryl Hannah
Sorority Row
Carrie Fisher
Kenny Chesney: Summer in 3-D
Kenny Chesney
End Game
Kurt Angle
If It Ain't Broke, Break It

2010s

2010
She's Out of My League #3 Mar. 12–18 #6 Mar. 19–25 #7 Mar. 26 – Apr. 1 #9 Apr. 2–8 #14 Apr. 9–15 #25 Apr. 16–22
Jay Baruchel, Alice Eve
Unstoppable #2 Nov.12-18 #3 Nov. 19–25 #5 Nov. 26 – Dec. 2 #4 Dec. 3–9 #6 Dec. 10–16 #12 Dec. 17–23 #17 Dec. 24–30 #15 Dec. 31 – Jan. 6 #18 Jan. 7–13
 Denzel Washington, Chris Pine, Rosario Dawson, Mimi Rogers
The Next Three Days #6 Nov. 19–25 #9 Nov. 26 – Dec. 2 #10 Dec. 3–9 #13 Dec. 10–16 #25 Dec. 17–23
Russell Crowe, Liam Neeson, Brian Dennehy, Elizabeth Banks
Love & Other Drugs #10 November. 19–25 #6 Nov. 26 – Dec. 2 #5 Dec. 3–9 #8 Dec. 10–16 #16 Dec. 17–23 #22 Dec. 31 – Jan. 6 #19 Jan. 7–13
Jake Gyllenhaal, Anne Hathaway
Dog Jack
Louis Gossett Jr.
The Chief
Tom Atkins
Chasing 3000
Ray Liotta, Willa Holland
Since I Don't Have You

2011

I Am Number Four #3 Feb. 18–24 #4 Feb. 25 – Mar. 3 #9 Mar. 4–10 #12 Mar. 11–17 #15 Mar. 18–24 #19 Mar. 25–31
Timothy Olyphant
Super 8 #1 Jun. 10–16 #2 Jun. 17–23 #5 Jun. 24 – Jul. 7 #7 Jul. 8–14 #9 Jul. 15–21 #14 Jul. 22–28
Elle Fanning, Kyle Chandler
Warrior #3 Sep. 9–15 #8 Sep. 16–22 #12 Sep. 23–29 #17 Sep. 30 – Oct. 6 #24 Oct. 7–13
 Tom Hardy, Joel Edgerton, Nick Nolte, Kurt Angle, Jennifer Morrison
Abduction #4 Sep. 23–29 #8 Sep. 30 – Oct. 6 #11 Oct. 7–13 #13 Oct. 14–20 #20 Oct. 21–27
Taylor Lautner, Alfred Molina, Sigourney Weaver
Death from Above
Margaret
Anna Paquin, Matt Damon, Matthew Broderick, Jean Reno, Allison Janney
Kurt Angle
River of Darkness
Kurt Angle
On the Inside
Olivia Wilde
Sibling
Michael Clarke Duncan, Mischa Barton, Devon Sawa
Riddle
Val Kilmer
Mafia
Ving Rhames, Pam Grier
A New York Heartbeat
Eric Roberts
Spineview

2012

One for the Money #3Jan. 27 – Feb. 2 #6Feb. 3–9 #13Feb. 10–16 #18Feb. 17–23
Daniel Sunjata, Katherine Heigl, Jason O'Mara
The Avengers #1May 4–24 #2May 25–31 #3Jun. 1–7 #5Jun. 8–14 #7Jun. 15–21 #8Jun. 22–28 #11Jun. 29 – Jul. 5 #12Jul. 6–19
Robert Downey Jr., Chris Evans, Mark Ruffalo, Chris Hemsworth, Scarlett Johansson
The Dark Knight Rises #1Jul. 20 – Aug. 9 #3Aug. 10–16 #5Aug. 17–23 #6Aug. 24–30 8Aug. 31 – Sep. 6 10Sep. 7–13 12Sep. 14–20 14Sep. 21–27
Christian Bale, Michael Caine, Tom Hardy, Joseph Gordon-Levitt, Gary Oldman, Morgan Freeman, Anne Hathaway
The Perks of Being a Wallflower #13Sep. 28 – Oct. 4 #11Oct. 5–11 #10Oct. 12–18 #12Oct. 19–25 #16Oct. 26 – Nov. 1 #17Nov. 2–8 #14Nov. 9–15
Logan Lerman, Emma Watson
Won't Back Down #10Sep. 28 – Oct. 4 #13Oct. 5–11 #23Oct. 12–18
Maggie Gyllenhaal, Holly Hunter
Jack Reacher #4Dec. 21–27 #5Dec. 28 – Jan. 10 #11Jan. 11–17 #16Jan. 18–24
Tom Cruise, Robert Duvall, Richard Jenkins, David Oyelowo, Rosamund Pike
A Separate Life
Progression
Homemakers
13 Score

2013
Promised Land #29Dec. 28, 2012 – Jan. 3 #10Jan. 4–10 #19Jan. 11–17
Matt Damon, John Krasinski, Hal Holbrook, Frances McDormand
Out of the Furnace #3Dec. 6–12 #7Dec. 13–19 #29Dec. 20–26
Christian Bale, Woody Harrelson, Forest Whitaker, Casey Affleck, Willem Dafoe, Zoe Saldana
Grudge Match #12Dec. 20–26 #11Dec. 27 – Jan. 2 2014 #11Jan. 3–9 #15Jan. 10–16
The Lifeguard
Martin Starr, Kristen Bell, Mamie Gummer
6 Souls
Julianne Moore, Jonathan Rhys Meyers
Generation Iron
Elixir
Chelsea Kane, Jane Seymour, Sara Paxton
Blood Brother
Rocky Braat

2014
The Fault in Our Stars #1Jun 6–12 #4Jun 13–19 #7Jun 20–26 #8Jun 27 – Jul 3 #11Jul 4–10 #15Jul 11–17 #19Jul 18–24
Shailene Woodley, Ansel Elgort, Laura Dern, Nat Wolff
Foxcatcher
Steve Carell, Mark Ruffalo, Channing Tatum, Sienna Miller
Heroes Behind the Badge: Sacrifice & Survival
Bridge
The Family Next Door

2015
Me & Earl & the Dying Girl
American Pastoral
Fathers and Daughters
Russell Crowe, Aaron Paul, Amanda Seyfried
The Last Witch Hunter
Vin Diesel
Concussion
Will Smith, Alec Baldwin
Southpaw
Jake Gyllenhaal, Rachel McAdams, Forest Whitaker, 50 Cent
Let It Snow

2016
Last Flag Flying
Steve Carell, Bryan Cranston, Laurence Fishburne
Fences
Denzel Washington, Viola Davis

2019
The Amusement Park
Lincoln Maazel
Sweet Girl
Jason Momoa, Isabela Moner
I'm Your Woman
Rachel Brosnahan
Ma Rainey's Black Bottom
Viola Davis, Chadwick Boseman
Happiest Season
Dan Levy, Kristen Stewart

See also

List of television shows shot in Pittsburgh
Pittsburgh Film Office
Three Rivers Film Festival

References

External links

Works cited
 Complete list of films shot in Pittsburgh
 Complete list of films shot in Pittsburgh
 "Hollywood East"
 Israeli filmmaker project
 Pittsburgh Film History

 
Lists of television series by setting
 
Lists of films shot in the United States
Films